Bunya Mountains road network is a group of roads that provide access to the mountain community from various lowland localities. The network ensures continuity of access in times of flooding or other natural disasters, and during planned maintenance activities. The locality of Bunya Mountains includes the Bunya Mountains National Park and the enclosed locality of Mowbullan. The area hosts a small residential community plus many tourism accommodation venues.

Located to the north-west of Toowoomba, north-east of Dalby and south-west of Kingaroy, in Queensland, Australia, Bunya Mountains is also a popular day-trip destination. Most traffic from north of Brisbane travels through Maidenwell, to the east of the mountain, or Kumbia, to the north, while most traffic from south and west of Brisbane approaches from the south.

Roads in the network
In addition to the New England Highway, D'Aguilar Highway and Bunya Highway, the following roads are considered to be part of the network:

Bunya Mountains–Maclagan Road

Bunya Mountains–Maclagan Road is a state-controlled district road (number 4163), part of which is rated as a local road of regional significance (LRRS). Together with Jondaryan–Nungil Road and Pechey–Maclagan Road it provides a fairly direct route from the Warrego Highway at Jondaryan to the Bunya Mountains.

Bunya Mountains Road

Bunya Mountains Road is a state-controlled district road (number 4161) rated as a local road of regional significance (LRRS). The southern climb/descent (from/to Moola) is steep and narrow with tight curves, while the northern climb/descent (from/to Alice Creek) is a less challenging road.

Dalby–Cooyar Road

It carries Bunya Mountains traffic from Dalby and other points on the Warrego Highway to either Kaimkillenbun or Maclagan, where roads to the Bunya Mountains originate.

Kingaroy–Cooyar Road

Kingaroy–Cooyar Road is a state-controlled district road (number 419) rated as a local road of regional significance (LRRS). It carries Bunya Mountains traffic primarily from the New England Highway to the Maidenwell–Bunya Mountains Road in Maidenwell.

Maidenwell–Bunya Mountains Road

Maidenwell–Bunya Mountains Road is a state-controlled district road (number 4196) rated as a local road of regional significance (LRRS). The climb/descent is steep and narrow, but with no sharp curves.

Nanango–Tarong Road

Nanango–Tarong Road is a state-controlled district road (number 429) rated as a local road of regional significance (LRRS). This road carries Bunya Mountains traffic from Nanango, including that arriving via the Burnett Highway, to Tarong. From there, the traffic follows the Kingaroy–Cooyar Road to Maidenwell, where it enters the Maidenwell–Bunya Mountains Road.

References

Roads in Queensland